Galina Evgenievna Nikolaeva (Russian: Гали́на Евге́ньевна Никола́ева) (18 February 1911, in Usmanka, Tomsk – 18 October 1963, in Moscow), maiden name Volyanskaya, was a Soviet writer. She was awarded the Stalin Prize in 1951 for her novel Harvest.

Harvest was translated and widely read in China, where it influenced China's socialist literature.

References 

20th-century Russian women writers
Soviet women writers
1911 births
1963 deaths